Peter J. McDonald (born July 16, 1912 in Cartwright, Manitoba; died May 4, 1971 in Victoria B.C.) was a politician in Manitoba, Canada.  He was a Progressive Conservative member of the Legislative Assembly of Manitoba from 1962 to 1966.

McDonald was educated at Holmfield, Manitoba and worked as an International Harvester dealer and farmer, also raising purebred Hereford cattle.  He served as vice-president of the Industrial Development Board of Killarney, was a councillor in that town from 1954 to 1958, and served as its mayor from 1959 to 1963.

He was elected to the Manitoba legislature in the 1962 provincial election, defeating incumbent Liberal Edward Dow by 1,015 votes in the constituency of Turtle Mountain.  He served as a backbench supporter of Dufferin Roblin's government during his time in the legislature.  In the 1966 election, he lost to Dow by only five votes.  He did not seek a return to the legislature after this time.

McDonald moved to Victoria, British Columbia around 1967 and died there a few years later.

References 

1912 births
1971 deaths
Progressive Conservative Party of Manitoba MLAs
People from Pembina Valley Region, Manitoba